HD 98649 is a G-type yellow dwarf star, classified as a G4V, that has approximately the same mass and diameter as the Sun, but has only 86% of its luminosity. It is considered a solar analog. HD 98649 is about 138 light-years from earth. HD 98649 is found in the Crater constellation.

Planetary system
From 1998 to 2012, the star was under observance from the CORALIE echelle spectrograph at La Silla Observatory.

In 2012, a long-period, wide-orbiting planet was deduced by radial velocity. This was published in November.

The discoverers noted, "HD 98649b is in the top five of the most eccentric planetary orbit and the most eccentric planet known with a period larger than 600 days." The reason for this eccentricity is unknown. They also submit it as a candidate for direct imaging, once it gets out to 10.4 AU at apoastron and 250 milliarcseconds of separation relative to Earth.

References

Notes 

Crater (constellation)
Planetary systems with one confirmed planet
G-type main-sequence stars
Durchmusterung objects
098649
055409
Solar analogs